Bilel Khefifi (born 2 September 1991) is a Tunisian professional footballer who plays as a forward for US Ben Guerdane.

Career 
Khefifi previously played domestically for CS Sfaxien, AS Gabès, Olympique Béja, US Ben Guerdane and Club Africain.

He scored his first goal in CAF Champions League on 4 December 2018, against APR in 2018–19 qualifying rounds.

On 15 January 2022, Khefifi joined Saudi Arabian club Jeddah.

Honours 
Club Africain
 Tunisian Cup: 2017–18

CS Hammam-Lif
 Tunisian Ligue Professionnelle 2: 2020–21

References

External links 
 
 

1991 births
Living people
People from Sfax
Tunisian footballers
Association football forwards
CS Sfaxien players
AS Gabès players
Olympique Béja players
US Ben Guerdane players
Club Africain players
CS Hammam-Lif players
Al-Salt SC players
Jeddah Club players
Tunisian Ligue Professionnelle 1 players
Jordanian Pro League players
Saudi First Division League players
Tunisian expatriate footballers
Tunisian expatriate sportspeople in Jordan
Tunisian expatriate sportspeople in Saudi Arabia
Expatriate footballers in Jordan
Expatriate footballers in Saudi Arabia